Leitner Creek is a  tributary of the upper Mississippi River. It rises in the bluffs overlooking the gorge of the Mississippi in east central Crawford County, Wisconsin, north of Prairie du Chien, entering the river just behind Lock and Dam No. 10.

Sources

Environmental Protection Agency
placenames.com
List of Wisconsin streams with map links

Tributaries of the Mississippi River
Rivers of Wisconsin
Rivers of Crawford County, Wisconsin